is a city located in Ōita Prefecture, Japan. As of March 1, 2017, the city has an estimated population of 29,661 and a population density of 114.00 persons per km². The total area is 280.03 km².

Geography

Climate
Kitsuki has a humid subtropical climate (Köppen climate classification Cfa) with hot summers and cool winters. Precipitation is significant throughout the year, but is somewhat lower in winter.

Demographics
Per Japanese census data, the population of Kitsuki in 2020 is 27,999 people. Kitsuki has been conducting censuses since 1950.

References

External links

 

Kitsuki, Oita